"('Cause) I'm Your Girl" is the debut single by South Korean girl group S.E.S., released via SM Entertainment on November 1, 1997, as part of the group's debut studio album I'm Your Girl. An R&B K-pop track, it was both written and produced by SM in-house producer Yoo Young-jin. The Japanese-language version of "('Cause) I'm Your Girl" was included in the 12cm release of their Japan debut single "Meguri Au Sekai", with a special remix single released afterwards on December 10, 1998, through VAP.

Background
"('Cause) I'm Your Girl" features rapping by Eric and Andy prior to their debut with Shinhwa. The music video remained one of the most requested ones on popular music shows of the time for 13 to 14 weeks. A remixed version of the song, featuring Japanese rapper Kreva, then a member of Kick the Can Crew, was included on the group's special single in Japan, released on December 10, 1998. In 2001, the song was included on SM Entertainment's greatest hits album, SM Best Album 2. The song was additionally included on S.E.S.'s 2003 Japanese compilation album of Korean songs, Beautiful Songs. In 2014 The remake music video, it features D.O. of Exo.

Reception
17 years after its release, the song re-charted on the Gaon Digital Chart at number 25 in the chart issue dated December 28, 2014 – January 3, 2015. In a survey involving 30 experts and 2,000 people published by The Dong-a Ilbo in September 2016, "('Cause) I'm Your Girl" was voted the third best female idol song by music experts and  the seventh best female idol song among the public in the past 20 years.

Legacy
In 2014, webzine Music Taste Y included "('Cause) I'm Your Girl" in their list of 120 Best Korean Dance Tracks of All Time at number 45, with critic Hong Hyuk-soo noting the song's "melodic simplicity and completeness" as well as the "neat arrangement and chorus, well-ordered characters and choreography" having been passed down to future generations as a textbook girl group song. In Melon and Seoul Shinmuns 2021 ranking of the Top 100 K-pop Songs of All Time, "('Cause) I'm Your Girl" placed at number 17, where music expert Lee Kyu-tak wrote that it "occupies a very important part in the history of K-pop, both in terms of the impact it had on the music world at the time of its release and the influence it had on future generations." Lee commented that along with H.O.T's "Descent of Warriors" and "Candy" (1996), "this song marked the beginning of K-pop and an important turning point that put SM Entertainment, the agency, in its current position."

Track listing
[Meguri Au Sekai] 12cm tracklist
 "Meguri Au Sekai" (めぐりあう世界; World Comes Around) 
 "Believe in Love" 
 "('Cause) I'm Your Girl" 
 "Oh, My Love"

Japanese remix single
 "Meguri Au Sekai" (Miami DJ Mix) (めぐりあう世界) 
 "Believe in Love" (Jon Robinson Groove Mix) 
 "('Cause) I'm Your Girl" (Kreva Mix) 
 "Oh, My Love" (Cyber Soul Mix)

Charts

Release history

References

1997 debut singles
S.E.S. (group) songs
Songs written by Yoo Young-jin